Pherallodiscus is a genus of clingfishes native to the central eastern Pacific Ocean along the coast of Mexico. Based on genetic studies the genus should be merged into Gobiesox.

Species
There are currently two recognized species in this genus:
 Pherallodiscus funebris (C. H. Gilbert, 1890) (Northern fraildisc clingfish)
 Pherallodiscus varius Briggs, 1955 (Southern fraildisc clingfish)

References

Gobiesocidae